The District of North Vancouver is a district municipality in British Columbia, Canada, and is part of Metro Vancouver. It surrounds the City of North Vancouver on three sides. As of 2016, the District stands as the second wealthiest city in Canada, with neighbouring West Vancouver the richest. The municipality is largely characterized as being a relatively quiet, affluent suburban hub home to many middle and upper-middle-class families. Homes in the District generally range from mid-sized family bungalows to very large luxury houses. A number of dense multi-family and mixed-use developments have popped up across the district in recent years; however, the District remains a primarily suburban municipality. The District is served by the Royal Canadian Mounted Police, British Columbia Ambulance Service, and the District of North Vancouver Fire Department.

History

For thousands of years, the Indigenous Squamish and their kin Tsleil-Waututh, of the Coast Salish, resided in the land known as North Vancouver. Slightly over 200 years ago, the people of the Squamish and Tsleil-Waututh living on the North Shore had their first glimpse of Europeans. First the Spanish arrived, giving their name to Vancouver's Spanish Banks and, in 1792, Captain George Vancouver explored the local shores. But it was not until 1862 that the first attempt was made to harvest the North Shore's rich stands of timber, leading to fuller settlement of the area that would later become North Vancouver.

The first industry on the North Shore was Pioneer Mills, founded in 1862 to log the huge trees of the coastal rainforest. After twice changing hands, the operation was bought by Sewell ("Sue") Prescott Moody in 1865. Near where the Saskatchewan Wheat Pool grain elevators now stand, the town of Moodyville grew up and stood as the main centre of activity on the North Shore until the mill closed in 1901. The first school was established in Moodyville. The second, Central School, opened in 1902 in a building that still stands as part of what is now Presentation House at 3rd Street and Chesterfield Avenue, the current home of the North Vancouver Museum and Archives.

In 1891, the first municipality on the North Shore was formed as the District of North Vancouver. It stretched across the North Shore from Horseshoe Bay to Deep Cove but omitted Moodyville. In the early years of the 20th century, a real estate boom took place, with speculators – including the British poet Rudyard Kipling – eager to turn a quick dollar. A new community began to take shape. In 1902, the Hotel North Vancouver was built; in 1905, the first bank, a branch of the Bank of North America, opened. A newspaper, the Express, commenced publication in 1905 and in 1906 the British Columbia Electric Railway began streetcar service.

Industry, particularly shipbuilding, became central, with the nearby stands of trees a rich resource for a society in which ships, houses and most other manmade things were constructed mainly of wood. The Wallace Shipyards moved in 1906 to the area just east of Lonsdale Avenue, drawn by the arrival of electricity. Over the years, this company, later known as Burrard Dry Dock and then Versatile Pacific Shipyards, became a major force in the local economy. Many of the shipyard's buildings still stand although the company has now ceased operations.

Economic prosperity and rapid growth in the Lower Lonsdale area of North Vancouver led to the establishment in 1907 of the separate City of North Vancouver, with a population of approximately 1,500. West Vancouver separated from the District in 1912. Apart from the addition of Moodyville in 1915, the boundaries of the City have not changed, even though far more people now call the District home.

Communications with Vancouver have always been an important factor in the development of the North Shore. The first ferry service was supplied by "Navvy Jack’s" rowboat in 1866. In 1867, the Sea Foam established regular ferry service that continued until 1958. The SeaBus re-established water transportation in 1977. Rail service was slower in developing. While the Pacific Great Eastern Railway inaugurated a 12.7-mile run from North Vancouver to Whytecliff Park in 1914, it was not until the completion of the first Second Narrows Bridge in 1925 that rail and road links with the Lower Mainland supplemented the local ferry service.

Early plans for North Vancouver were ambitious. However, early grandiose plans met with a number of setbacks. The real estate boom was overtaken by a worldwide depression in 1913 and then World War I delayed many projects. The depression that began in 1929, coupled with disruptions to communications over the Second Narrows caused by ships colliding with the bridge, led to economic difficulties and severe tax shortfalls. Both the City and the District were placed in receivership in 1933. But the opening of the second road crossing, the Lions' Gate Bridge in 1938 was a significant factor in making the North Shore more accessible. And the war years led to an economic revival of North Vancouver, especially because of the many ships built in the Burrard Dry Dock at the foot of Lonsdale for the Canadian war effort.

In the postwar years, the City and the District of North Vancouver boomed, with most of the growth taking place in the District because of its greater land resources.

Geography

The District of North Vancouver is separated from Vancouver by the Burrard Inlet. It can be accessed by the Lions' Gate Bridge, the Ironworkers Memorial Second Narrows Crossing, and the SeaBus passenger ferry.

The District is bounded by the Capilano River to the west, Indian Arm to the east, Burrard Inlet to the south, and the Coast Mountains to the north. It sprawls in an east-west direction across the mountain slopes, and is characterized by rugged terrain and steep and winding roadways. While there is no true urban core within the District, there are a number of separate commercial neighbourhood centres. These include (from west to east): Edgemont Village, Upper Lonsdale, Lynn Valley, Main Street, Parkgate, and Deep Cove.
The District has a lot in common with West Vancouver and the City of North Vancouver. Together these three municipalities are commonly referred to as the North Shore. Most of the residents of the District live in single-family dwellings. Except for a few more historical areas, much of the development of the District has occurred since the 1950s. The City of North Vancouver has considerably higher commercial and residential density.

Climate
North Vancouver has an oceanic climate (Köppen climate type Cfb).

Government and politics

Industry
While industry was the engine that propelled North Vancouver for much of the twentieth century, this has now largely been replaced by enterprises more in tune with present economic realities. Many North Shore companies are in the business of creating and marketing high technology.

The television and film industry has made the area the centre of Hollywood North. Filming of the series The X-Files took place in North Vancouver for five seasons, with many of its "wilderness" sequences shot in the Lower Seymour Conservation Reserve (LSCR).

Sites of interest

The Capilano Suspension Bridge in a private park carries hikers across the Capilano River to nature trails and a unique rain forest canopy walk (there is an admission fee).
The Lynn Canyon Suspension Bridge is in a District of North Vancouver public park (free admission). Also at the park is the Lynn Canyon Ecology Centre.
Grouse Mountain is a ski hill and a tourist destination reached by either a gondola lift or the famous Grouse Grind hike.
Mount Seymour Provincial Park is a ski and hiking destination in the District.
The Cleveland Dam in the Capilano River Regional Park offers nature trails as well as a fish hatchery, the Capilano River Hatchery.
Mount Fromme is a mountain bicycling destination.
Northlands Golf Course is a public golf course owned and operated by the District of North Vancouver.
Maplewood Flats Conservation Area is a conservation area known for its bird watching and easy to access trails
Maplewood Farm is an educational children's farm operated by the District of North Vancouver

Transportation
The main (and only) highway through the District of North Vancouver is the Trans-Canada Highway (Highway 1). This crosses over the Ironworkers Memorial Second Narrows Crossing from Vancouver and goes through the District to the western border with West Vancouver.

Public transit is operated by Coast Mountain Bus Company and funded by TransLink. There is an integrated network of buses between the District, The City of North Vancouver, and West Vancouver, as well as buses connecting these municipalities with the rest of the Lower Mainland. The SeaBus ferry is also an integral part of transit for the District; it stops at Lonsdale Quay, which connects the North Shore with Vancouver, and Waterfront station, which connects to the SkyTrain network. West Vancouver Blue Bus also runs several routes between the two North Vancouvers and West Vancouver.  there is no rapid transit service on the North Shore, but TransLink is planning a bus rapid transit line from Metrotown in Burnaby to Park Royal in West Vancouver as a measure to bring rapid transit to the traffic-congested North Shore.

Demographics 

Ethnicity 

Note: Totals greater than 100% due to multiple origin responses.

Languages 
Mother languages as reported by each person:

In terms of Chinese languages, 2.7% of the population speak Mandarin, 1.7% speak Cantonese and 0.2% speak other varieties.

Religion 
According to the 2021 census, religious groups in North Vancouver included:
Irreligion (48,275 persons or 55.2%)
Christianity (29,845 persons or 34.2%)
Islam (5,570 persons or 6.4%)
Judaism (845 persons or 1.0%)
Buddhism (775 persons or 0.9%)
Sikhism (550 persons or 0.6%)
Hinduism (295 persons or 0.3%)
Indigenous spirituality (15 persons or <0.1%)

In terms of Christianity, 12.4% of the population was Catholic, 11.4% were Protestant, 7.2% were Christian n.o.s, 0.9% were Christian Orthodox, and 2.2% belonged to other Christian denominations and Christian-related traditions.

Notes

References

External links
 

 
1891 establishments in British Columbia
District municipalities in British Columbia
Populated places on the British Columbia Coast
Populated places in Greater Vancouver
Populated places established in 1891